Mark Alan Stamaty is an American cartoonist and children's writer and illustrator. During the 1980s and 1990s, Stamaty's work appeared regularly in the Village Voice. He is the creator of the long-running comic strip Washingtoon – on which a short-lived (12-episode) 1985 Showtime Network television series was based – as well as the earlier comic strip MacDoodle Street, and the online strip Doodlennium for Slate magazine He is also a spot illustrator for Slate. He produced a monthly comic strip in the New York Times Book Review called "Boox" in 2001–2004 that made fun of publishing trends. Stamaty graduated with a degree in art from the Cooper Union in New York.

Stamaty has published several books, including collections of his strips and graphic novels for children, notably Alia's Mission: Saving the Books of Iraq (2004), Yellow Yellow (1971, with author Frank Asch; reissued in 2019 by Drawn & Quarterly), Minnie Maloney & Macaroni (1976) and the cult classic Who Needs Donuts? (originally published in 1973 and reprinted by Random House in 2003)

In 2012, Jeffrey Brown told USA Today about how Stamaty's Small in the Saddle had influenced his own career and about subsequently meeting the author.

Stamaty was commissioned to provide an illustration for the interior of retailer Sonos's new store in New York City's SoHo district, which opened in July 2016.

In 2018, Stamaty drew the cover for "Delancey St. Station", the debut album by NYC rock band, Pinc Louds.
 
His late father, Stanley Stamaty, was a professional gag cartoonist, and his mother, Clara Gee Stamaty, is a commercial illustrator and fine artist. Stanley and Clara both attended the Art Academy of Cincinnati.

References

External links
Official website

American comic strip cartoonists
Cooper Union alumni
Living people
1947 births
The Village Voice people